Cristian Nava (born September 2, 2003) is an American soccer player who plays for New Mexico United in the USL Championship as an academy player.

Career

Youth 
On January 25, 2021, Nava joined the New Mexico United academy ahead of its inaugural season. He had previously played with Guadalajara Scorpions, New Mexico Rush, and Rio Rapids. On June 8, 2021, Nava signed a USL academy contract with New Mexico allowing him to compete for their USL Championship side whilst maintaining his college eligibility.

Nava made his debut on July 9, 2021, appearing as a 71st-minute substitute during a 3–1 win over Colorado Springs Switchbacks.

Professional career
On August 21, 2021, Nava signed a professional contract with New Mexico United. He scored his first professional goal on May 24th, 2022 in a 7-0 victory over Phoenix Rising FC.

References

External links
 

2003 births
American soccer players
Association football forwards
Living people
New Mexico United players
Soccer players from Albuquerque, New Mexico
USL Championship players